White Oak is an unincorporated community in Dunklin County, Missouri, United States. It is located on Route 25, approximately five miles north of Kennett.

A post office called White Oak was established in 1891, and the name was changed to Whiteoak in 1895. The community was named for a grove of white oak trees near the original town site.

Demographics

References

Unincorporated communities in Dunklin County, Missouri
Unincorporated communities in Missouri